Vasily Alexandrovich Mosin (born 9 May 1972, in Kazan) is a Russian sport shooter who specializes in the double trap.

At the 2004 Olympic Games he finished in nineteenth place in the double trap qualification, missing out on a place among the top six, who progressed to the final round.

He then finished third at the 2005 European Championships and won the 2006 European Championships. At the 2008 Olympic Games he finished in fourteenth place in the double trap qualification, missing a place among the top six, who progressed to the final round.

In the 2012 Olympics, he finished third in double trap, earning a bronze medal.

References
Profile

1972 births
Living people
Russian male sport shooters
Shooters at the 2004 Summer Olympics
Shooters at the 2008 Summer Olympics
Shooters at the 2012 Summer Olympics
Shooters at the 2016 Summer Olympics
Olympic shooters of Russia
Trap and double trap shooters
Olympic bronze medalists for Russia
Olympic medalists in shooting
Medalists at the 2012 Summer Olympics
Shooters at the 2015 European Games
European Games competitors for Russia